Ukrainian football clubs have participated in European football competitions since 1965, when in the 1965–66 season, Dynamo Kyiv took part in the UEFA Cup Winners' Cup – the first Ukrainian and the first Soviet club to do so. In total, 17 clubs have represented Ukraine in European competition, among which 7 also previously represented the Soviet Union.

History
Dynamo Kyiv made a bold entry in the continental competitions back in 1965–66 as holders of the 1964 Soviet Cup.

Until 1993 Ukrainian clubs represented the Soviet Union. Upon dissolution of the Soviet Union all their points were passed on to the Russian football federation clubs boosting the Russian coefficient and placing Russia among best ranking federations in Europe, while Ukrainian federation clubs started out from scratch.

As part of the Soviet Union, Dynamo Kyiv participated in 24 various competitions playing over hundred games and winning three trophies. Its star player Oleg Blokhin became one of the most recognized players not for the Kyiv's club, but for the whole Soviet football.

Beside Dynamo, the Soviet football was also represented by other six clubs from Ukraine among which are Shakhtar Donetsk with 5 European seasons and Dnipro Dnipropetrovsk with 6 European seasons.

Since attaining independence, Ukraine was represented by many new clubs some of which played in Soviet competition, while some others never existed in the Soviet Union.

FC Dynamo Kyiv (1965), FC Karpaty Lviv (1970), FC Zorya Luhansk (1973), FC Chornomorets Odesa (1975), FC Shakhtar Donetsk (1977), FC Dnipro (1984), FC Metalist Kharkiv (1988), SC Tavriya Simferopol (1992), FC Nyva Vinnytsia (1996), FC Vorskla Poltava (1997), CSKA Kyiv (1998), FC Kryvbas Kryvyi Rih (1999), FC Metalurh Donetsk (2002), FC Metalurh Zaporizhya (2002), FC Illichivets Mariupol (2004), FC Oleksandriya (2016), FC Olimpik Donetsk (2017), FC Desna Chernihiv (2020), FC Kolos Kovalivka (2020).

Ukrainian clubs in Europe during the Soviet period
Ukraine was the only other union republic of the Soviet Union beside Russia that also managed to have representation in Europe almost every season starting with the first participation of Soviet clubs in European club competitions.

 1965–66 Dynamo Kyiv CWC
 1966–67 (none)
 1967–68 Dynamo Kyiv EC
 1968–69 Dynamo Kyiv EC (boycott)
 1969–70 Dynamo Kyiv EC
 1970–71 Karpaty Lviv CWC
 1971–72 (none)
 1972–73 Dynamo Kyiv EC
 1973–74 Zoria Voroshilovhrad EC / Dynamo Kyiv UC
 1974–75 Dynamo Kyiv CWC
 1975–76 Dynamo Kyiv EC / Chornomorets Odesa UC
 1976–77 Dynamo Kyiv EC / Shakhtar Donetsk UC
 1977–78 Dynamo Kyiv UC
 1978–79 Dynamo Kyiv EC / Shakhtar Donetsk CWC
 1979–80 Dynamo Kyiv UC, Shakhtar Donetsk UC
 1980–81 Dynamo Kyiv UC, Shakhtar Donetsk UC
 1981–82 Dynamo Kyiv EC
 1982–83 Dynamo Kyiv EC
 1983–84 Dynamo Kyiv UC / Shakhtar Donetsk CWC
 1984–85 Dnipro Dnipropetrovsk EC
 1985–86 Dnipro Dnipropetrovsk UC, Chornomorets Odesa UC / Dynamo Kyiv CWC
 1986–87 Dynamo Kyiv EC / Dnipro Dnipropetrovsk UC
 1987–88 Dynamo Kyiv EC
 1988–89 Dnipro Dnipropetrovsk UC / Metalist Kharkiv CWC
 1989–90 Dnipro Dnipropetrovsk EC / Dynamo Kyiv UC
 1990–91 Dnipro Dnipropetrovsk UC, Chornomorets Odesa UC / Dynamo Kyiv CWC
 1991–92 Dynamo Kyiv EC

Summary
All-time table includes records for the Soviet period as well as the period of independent Ukraine.

S = seasons, GP = games played, W = won, D = drawn, L = lost, GS = goals scored, GA = goals allowed, GD = goals difference, Pts = points, LA = last appearance.

All-time coefficient

Multiple European competition winners from Ukraine

European and World competition winners

UEFA Champions League/European Cup
Until 1992–93 Ukrainian teams represented the Soviet Union. The Soviet teams did not enter the European Cup competitions until 1966. In 1992 the competition's name has changed to UEFA Champions League.

Notes: Blue border colour indicates seasons for which UEFA coefficient earned by Ukrainian clubs was awarded to Russia.

Note: UEFA denotes qualified for the UEFA Cup/Europa League.

UEFA Europa League/UEFA Cup
Until 1992–93 Ukrainian teams represented the Soviet Union. The Soviet teams did not play in the Inter-Cities Fairs Cup. In 2009 the competition's name has changed to UEFA Europa League.

Notes: Blue border colour indicates seasons for which UEFA coefficient earned by Ukrainian clubs was awarded to Russia.

UEFA Europa Conference League

UEFA Cup Winners' Cup
The UEFA Cup Winners' Cup became the first continental competition in which Soviet clubs began their international participation in 1965. Until 1992–93 Ukrainian teams represented the Soviet Union.

Notes: Blue border colour indicates seasons for which UEFA coefficient earned by Ukrainian clubs was awarded to Russia.

UEFA Super Cup
Ukrainian clubs have won the competition once for the Soviet Union and taken part on two other occasions (only two clubs qualify). In total there are three fixtures featuring Ukrainian clubs.

UEFA Intertoto Cup

Stadiums

UEFA Champions League / European Cup
 Olimpiyskiy National Sports Complex, Kyiv (FC Dynamo Kyiv, 83)
 Stadion Dynamo im.V.Lobanovskoho, Kyiv (FC Dynamo Kyiv, 29)
 Tsentralny Stadion ChMP, Odesa (FC Dynamo Kyiv, 1)
 Stadion Avanhard, Luhansk (FC Zorya Luhansk, 2)
 Stadion Lokomotyv, Simferopol (FC Dynamo Kyiv, 2)
 Stadion Metalist, Kharkiv (FC Dynamo Kyiv, 2)
 Stadion Dinamo im.V.Lenina, Tbilisi (FC Dynamo Kyiv, 1)
 Stadion Metalurh, Kryvyi Rih (FC Dnipro, 3)
 Stadion Meteor, Dnipro (FC Dnipro, 3)
 Stadion Lokomotyv, Simferopol (SC Tavriya Simferopol, 2)
 Tsentralny Stadion Shakhtar, Donetsk (FC Shakhtar Donetsk, 10)
 Regional Sports Complex Olimpiyskiy, Donetsk (FC Shakhtar Donetsk, 20)
 Donbass Arena, Donetsk (FC Shakhtar Donetsk, 15)
 Metalist Oblast Sports Complex, Kharkiv (FC Metalist Kharkiv, 1)
 Arena Lviv, Lviv (FC Shakhtar Donetsk, 10)
 Metalist Oblast Sports Complex, Kharkiv (FC Shakhtar Donetsk, 6)

UEFA Europa League / UEFA Cup
 Olimpiyskiy National Sports Complex, Kyiv (FC Dynamo Kyiv, 35)
 Tsentralny Stadion ChMP, Odesa (FC Chornomorets Odesa, 12)
 Tsentralny Stadion Shakhtar, Donetsk (FC Shakhtar Donetsk, 12)
 Regional Sports Complex Olimpiyskiy, Donetsk (FC Shakhtar Donetsk, 15)
 Stadion Dynamo im.V.Lobanovskoho, Kyiv (FC Dynamo Kyiv, 18)
 Stadion Metalurh, Kryvyi Rih (FC Dnipro, 6)
 Stadion Meteor, Dnipro (FC Dnipro, 23)
 Stadion Vorskla, Poltava (FC Vorskla Poltava, 15)
 Stadion Ukrayina, Lviv (FC Karpaty Lviv, 9)
 Stadion Metalurh, Kryvyi Rih (FC Kryvbas Kryvyi Rih, 1)
 Stadion Dynamo im.V.Lobanovskoho, Kyiv (FC Arsenal Kyiv, 4)
 Stadion Meteor, Dnipro (FC Metalurh Zaporizhya, 2)
 Tsentralny Stadion Shakhtar, Donetsk (FC Metalurh Donetsk, 4)
 Regional Sports Complex Olimpiyskiy, Donetsk (FC Metalurh Donetsk, 1)
 Stadion im.V.Boiko, Mariupol (FC Mariupol, 2)
 Slavutych-Arena, Zaporizhzhia (FC Metalurh Zaporizhya, 2)
 Oblast Sports Complex Metalist, Kharkiv (FC Metalist Kharkiv, 25)
 Stadion Metalurh, Donetsk (FC Metalurh Donetsk, 6)
 Donbass Arena, Donetsk (FC Shakhtar Donetsk, 4)
 Dnipro-Arena, Dnipro (FC Dnipro, 16)
 Lokomotyv Republican Sports Complex, Simferopol, (SC Tavriya Simferopol, 1)
 Stadion Chornomorets, Odesa (FC Chornomorets Odesa, 8)
 GSP Stadium, Nicosia (FC Dynamo Kyiv, 1)
 Obolon Arena, Kyiv (FC Zorya Luhansk, 1)
 Stadion Dynamo im.V.Lobanovskoho, Kyiv (FC Zorya Luhansk, 4)
 Olimpiyskiy National Sports Complex, Kyiv (FC Dnipro, 8)
 Olimpiyskiy National Sports Complex, Kyiv (FC Metalist Kharkiv, 1)
 Stadion Dynamo im.V.Lobanovskoho, Kyiv (FC Metalist Kharkiv, 1)
 Arena Lviv, Lviv (FC Metalist Kharkiv, 2)
 Arena Lviv, Lviv (FC Shakhtar Donetsk, 8)
 Cultural and Sports Complex Nika, Oleksandriia (FC Oleksandriya, 3)
 Stadion Chornomorets, Odesa (FC Zorya Luhansk, 3)
 Oblast Sports Complex Metalist, Kharkiv (FC Shakhtar Donetsk, 2)
 Stadion Dynamo im.V.Lobanovskoho, Kyiv (FC Olimpik Donetsk, 1)
 Arena Lviv, Lviv (FC Zorya Luhansk, 3)
 Stadion Chornomorets, Odesa (FC Mariupol, 2)
 Slavutych-Arena, Zaporizhzhia (FC Zorya Luhansk, 2)
 Olimpiyskiy National Sports Complex, Kyiv (FC Vorskla Poltava, 1)

UEFA Cup Winners' Cup
 Olimpiyskiy National Sports Complex, Kyiv (FC Dynamo Kyiv, 13)
 Stadion Dinamo im.V.Lenina, Tbilisi (FC Dynamo Kyiv, 1)
 Stadion Ukrayina, Lviv (FC Karpaty Lviv, 2)
 Stadion Lokomotyv, Donetsk (FC Shakhtar Donetsk, 1)
 Tsentralny Stadion Shakhtar, Donetsk (FC Shakhtar Donetsk, 8)
 Stadion Metalist, Kharkiv (FC Metalist Kharkiv, 2)
 Tsentralny Stadion ChMP, Odesa (FC Chornomorets Odesa, 3)
 Tsentralny Misky Stadion, Vinnytsia (FC Nyva Vinnytsia, 2)
 Stadion Dynamo, Kyiv (FC CSKA Kyiv, 2)

UEFA Intertoto Cup
 Tsentralny Stadion Shakhtar, Donetsk (FC Shakhtar Donetsk, 2)
 Stadion Vorskla, Poltava (FC Vorskla Poltava, 3)
 Stadion Lokomotyv, Simferopol (SC Tavriya Simferopol, 4)
 Stadion Meteor, Dnipro (FC Dnipro, 2)
 Tsentralny Stadion ChMP, Odesa (FC Chornomorets Odesa, 2)

Women's football

UEFA Women's Champions League/UEFA Women's Cup

Statistics by club
 FC Dynamo Kyiv in European football
 FC Shakhtar Donetsk in European football
 FC Dnipro in European football
 FC Metalurh Donetsk in European football
 FC Zorya Luhansk in European football

Notes

References

External links
 Ukrainian clubs in Eurocups: waiting for the 1,000th game (Українські клуби в єврокубках: чекаємо 1000-го матчу). Ukrainian Premier League. 31 August 2018
 Performance table

Ukraine